Luc Van den Bossche (born 16 September 1947, in Aalst, Belgium) is a Belgian socialist politician and father of Freya Van den Bossche.

He graduated as a Doctor in law at the University of Ghent in 1970. Luc Van den Bossche was a Member of Parliament for a number of years and cabinet member in several federal and regional governments in Belgium. Currently he is chairman of the Brussels International Airport Company (BIAC) and of the Associatie UGent, as well as board member in several companies. He is a member of the Advisory Board of the Itinera Institute think-tank.

Sources
 Luc Van den Bossche (Dutch)
 Luc Van den Bossche (Dutch)
 Luc Van den Bossche blijft (voorlopig) Biac leiden (Dutch)

References 

Flemish politicians
Belgian socialists
Ghent University alumni
Living people
People from Aalst, Belgium
1947 births